"This Guy's in Love with You" is a song written by Burt Bacharach and Hal David, and recorded by Herb Alpert.  Although known primarily for his trumpet playing as the leader of the Tijuana Brass, Alpert sang lead vocals on this solo recording, arranged by Bacharach. An earlier recording of the song was by British singer Danny Williams titled "That Guy's in Love", which appears on his 1968 self-titled album.

History
The song appears to have originally been written by Hal David with lyrics to be sung by a female singer. 

A version was then released by Danny Williams, with lyrics about his female partner being in love with another man, some months before the Alpert version.

Herb Alpert version
As documented in an A&E Biography episode featuring Bacharach, the recording originated when Alpert, while visiting at Bacharach's office, asked,  "Say, Burt, do you happen to have any old compositions lying around that you and Hal never recorded; maybe one I might be able to use?" Alpert said he made it his practice to ask songwriters that particular question: often a "lost pearl" was revealed.  As it happened, Bacharach recalled one, found the lyrics and score sheet in his office filing cabinet, and offered it to Alpert: "Here, Herb... you might like this one."

Alpert saw the possibilities in the composition for recording it himself. The composition had a recognizable Bacharach-David feel, a spot for a signature horn solo in the bridge and in the fadeout, and it was an easy song to sing within Alpert's vocal range.

Alpert originally sang "This Guy's in Love with You" on a 1968 television special, The Beat of the Brass. In response to numerous viewer telephone calls to the network following the broadcast, Alpert decided that the song should be released as a single recording, and it reached No. 1 on the U.S. Billboard Hot 100 pop singles chart in June of that year, remaining in the top position for four weeks.  It was not only Alpert's first No. 1 single, but it was also the first No. 1 single for his A&M record label, as well as the first No. 1 in the U.S. for Bacharach & David. The song also spent ten weeks at No. 1 on the Easy Listening chart. For the single's B-side, Alpert chose "A Quiet Tear" from his first album in 1962, The Lonely Bull.

Other renditions
Several female vocalists have rendered the song as "This Girl's in Love with You". Nancy Sinatra debuted this version live on The Ed Sullivan Show on May 26, 1968. Dionne Warwick was the first to record this version of the song, as "This Girl's in Love With You", which was released as a single in 1969, reaching No. 7 in the U.S. that same year. It also spent four weeks at No. 2 on the Easy Listening chart. It ranked as the 64th biggest US hit of 1969. Ella Fitzgerald recorded the song in a live set recorded in San Francisco in 1968, originally released on MPS, and re-issued on CD by Verve as The Sunshine of Your Love in 1996. Dusty Springfield also covered the song on her album Dusty... Definitely released in the UK in November 1968.

Sammy Davis Jr. recorded the song in 1969; the resulting version appeared on each of his final two albums for Reprise Records, and he performed it live in his concerts, including at one memorable appearance in Hamburg that same year.

Eydie Gormé had a hit on the U.S. Easy Listening chart with her rendition (from her eponymous 1968 LP) reaching number 22 during the summer of 1968. Debuting the same week, Tony Mottola had a hit (from his 'Warm, Wild and Wonderful' LP) on the U.S. Easy Listening chart, also reaching number 22.

Australian group the Reels released a version as a single and on the album Beautiful in 1982. It reached No. 7 on the Australian charts and was the 90th biggest selling single in 1982 in Australia.

On 29 June 1996 at the London Festival Hall, Noel Gallagher of Oasis sang a version of the song with Bacharach playing piano; the following weekend it was aired on BBC Radio 2.

Mac DeMarco covered the song in 2014, which served as an "introduction" to his touring band's new guitarist, Andy White of Tonstartssbandht.

Chart history

Weekly charts

Year-end charts

Herb Alpert

All-time charts

The single achieved sales of over 50,000 copies in Australia, being eligible for the award of a Gold Disc.

Dionne Warwick version

Tony Mottola cover

Eydie Gorme cover

References

Bibliography
The Billboard Book of Top 40 Hits, 6th Edition, 1996

External links

 
 

1968 songs
1968 singles
1969 singles
Number-one singles in Australia
RPM Top Singles number-one singles
Billboard Hot 100 number-one singles
Cashbox number-one singles
Songs with music by Burt Bacharach
Songs with lyrics by Hal David
Andy Kim songs
Herb Alpert songs
Faith No More songs
Dionne Warwick songs
Petula Clark songs
The Reels songs
A&M Records singles
Scepter Records singles